The General Assembly of Nova Scotia was established by a proclamation of the Governor in Council on May 20, 1758.  A writ for the election of the 1st General Assembly of Nova Scotia was issued by May 22, returnable at the convening of the assembly on October 2, 1758.  The assembly held two sessions, and was dissolved on August 13, 1759.

Sessions
Dates of specific sessions are under research.

Governor and Council
Governor Charles Lawrence
Lieutenant Governor vacant?

The members of the Council are currently under research.

House of Assembly

Officers
Speaker of the House
Robert Sanderson -left the province for England in 1759.
William Nesbitt elected August 1, 1759
Clerk of the House David Lloyd

Division of seats
Since counties had not been established by this time, the proclamation called for the election of 4 members from Halifax Township, 2 members from Lunenburg Township, and 16 members from the province at large, for a total of 22 members.

The election was held using Block Voting. Each voter had to cast the maximum number of votes, whether 16, two or four.

Knaut and Kedie (or Kedy) represented Lunenburg Township, but the records do not distinguish the Halifax Township members from the at large members.

Members
 Joseph Gerrish
 Robert Sanderson -left the province for England in 1759.
 Henry Newton
 William Foye
 William Nesbitt
 Joseph Rundel
 Jonathan Binney
 Henry Ferguson
 George Suckling
 John Burbidge
 Robert Campbell
 William Pantree
 Joseph Fairbanks
 Philip Hammond
 John Fillis 
 Lambert Folkers
 Philip Augustus Knaut (Lunenburg Township)
 William Best
 Alexander Kedie (Lunenburg Township)
Malachy Salter -took seat Oct. 30, 1758.
Benjamin Gerrish -might not have served, was out of the province by Nov. 21, 1758.
John Anderson -might not have served, was out of the province by Nov. 21, 1758.
Archibald Hinshelwood -by-election Jan. 10, 1759, took seat April 6, 1759, election disputed by Richard Bowers, Hinshelwood quit his seat April 9.
no record of the by-election for the second vacancy.

Note:  Unless otherwise noted, members were elected at the general election, and took their seats at the convening of the assembly.  By-elections are special elections held to fill specific vacancies.  When a member is noted as having taking their seat on a certain date, but a by-election isn't noted, the member was elected at the general election but arrived late.

References 

Democracy 250 : Celebrating 250 Years of Parliamentary Democracy in Canada
A Directory of the Members of the Legislative Assembly of Nova Scotia, 1758–1958, Public Archives of Nova Scotia (1958)

01
1758 in Canada
1759 in Canada
1758 establishments in Nova Scotia
1759 disestablishments in Nova Scotia